Two regiments of the British Army have been numbered the 114th Regiment of Foot:

114th Regiment of Foot (1761), raised in 1761 and disbanded in 1763.
114th Regiment of Foot (1794), raised in 1794 and disbanded the following year